Karaki is an Arabic surname. Notable people with the surname include:

 Khaled Al-Karaki (born 1946), Jordanian author, poet, academic and politician
 Mirza Mohammad Karaki, Iranian cleric and statesman
 Rima Karaki, Lebanese news anchor

Arabic-language surnames